The 1997 Advanta Championships of Philadelphia was a women's tennis tournament played on indoor carpet courts at the Villanova University Pavilion in Villanova, Pennsylvania in the United States that was part of Tier II of the 1997 WTA Tour. It was the 15th edition of the tournament and was held from November 10 through November 16, 1997. First-seeded Martina Hingis won the singles title.

Finals

Singles

 Martina Hingis defeated  Lindsay Davenport 7–5, 6–7, 7–6
 It was Hingis' 12th title of the year and the 26th of her career.

Doubles

 Lisa Raymond /  Rennae Stubbs defeated  Lindsay Davenport /  Jana Novotná 6–3, 7–5
 It was Raymond's 2nd title of the year and the 8th of her career. It was Stubbs' 2nd title of the year and the 13th of her career.

References

External links
 ITF tournament edition details
 Tournament draws

Advanta Championships of Philadelphia
Advanta Championships of Philadelphia
Advanta
Advanta
Advanta Championships of Philadelphia